Lliçà de Vall is a municipality in Catalonia, Spain in the province of Barcelona in the comarca, Valles Oriental. As of 2013, the population is 6,182.

References

External links
 Government data pages 

Municipalities in Vallès Oriental